Miss Venezuela 2016 was the 63rd edition of the Miss Venezuela pageant held on October 5, 2016 at the Estudio 1 de Venevisión in Caracas, Venezuela. At the end of the event, outgoing titleholder Mariam Habach of Lara crowned Keysi Sayago of Monagas as her successor. This is the first time Miss Venezuela hasn't awarded Miss Earth Venezuela

Results 
Color key

Order of announcements

Top 10
 Distrito Capital
 
 
 
 
 
 
 
 
 

Top 5

Special Awards

These awards were given during the telecast of the pageant on October 5:

Gala Interactiva de la Belleza (Interactive Beauty Gala)

This preliminary event took place on September 10, 2016 co-hosted by Mariela Celis, Jesús de Alva and Dave Capella. The following awards were given by fan vote on missvenezuela.com and Twitter.

Judges

Anna Vaccarella – Journalist.
Daniela Kosán – Miss Venezuela International 1997
Ivo Contreras – Stylist.
Jesús Morales – Fashion advisor.
Maickel Melamed – Athlete.
Jackeline Rodríguez – Venezuelan representative in Miss Universe 1991.
Yajaira Nuñez – Designer and goldsmith.
José Ramón Barreto – Actor.
Michelle de Andrade – Actress.

Contestants

Notes 
 Keysi Sayago (Monagas) placed as Top 5 in Miss Universe 2017 in Las Vegas, Nevada, United States.
 Diana Croce (Nueva Esparta) placed as 2nd runner-up in Miss International 2017 in Tokyo, Japan. She previously competed in Miss World 2016 in Washington, D.C., United States, but did not place.
 Antonella Massaro (Vargas) placed as 2nd runner-up in Reina Hispanoamericana 2016 in Santa Cruz, Bolivia.
 María Victoria D´Ambrosio (Guárico) placed as 2nd runner-up in Reina Hispanoamericana 2017 in Santa Cruz, Bolivia.
 Tulia Alemán (Falcón) placed as 1st runner-up in Miss Grand International 2017 in Phú Quốc, Vietnam.
 Yanett Díaz (Distrito Capital) placed as 1st runner-up in Reinado Internacional del Café 2018 in Manizales, Colombia.
 Betania Rojas Rincón (Táchira) placed as 2nd runner-up in Miss Tourism Global 2018 in Shandong, China.

References

External links
Miss Venezuela Official Website

Miss Venezuela
2016 beauty pageants
2016 in Venezuela